The 2017–18 Georgia Southern Eagles men's basketball team represented Georgia Southern University during the 2017–18 NCAA Division I men's basketball season. The Eagles, led by fifth-year head coach Mark Byington, played their home games at Hanner Fieldhouse in Statesboro, Georgia as members of the Sun Belt Conference. They finished the season 21–12, 11–7 in Sun Belt play to finish in third place. They defeated Louisiana–Monroe in the quarterfinals of the Sun Belt tournament before losing in the semifinals to Georgia State. Despite having 21 wins, they did not participate in a postseason tournament.

Previous season
The Eagles finished the 2016–17 season 18–18, 11–7 in Sun Belt play to finish in a three-way tie for third place. They lost in the quarterfinals of the Sun Belt tournament to Troy. They were invited to the College Basketball Invitational where they lost in the first round to Utah Valley.

Roster

Schedule and results

|-
!colspan=9 style=| Exhibition

|-
!colspan=9 style=| Non-conference regular season

|-
!colspan=9 style=| Sun Belt Conference regular season

|-
!colspan=9 style=| Sun Belt tournament

Source

References

Georgia Southern Eagles men's basketball seasons
Georgia Southern
Georgia Southern
Georgia Southern